The  is a structural expressionist office building located in Minato, Tokyo, Japan. It houses the headquarters of Nippon Television. The 32-storey building has a height of 192 metres. Construction was finished in 2003. 

As a part of the design and aesthetics of the exterior, the building has 2 large sculpture pieces attached one either side. Majority of people would assume it was decorative but in fact it was designed by Richard Rogers Partnership to assist the building from wind loads and during earthquakes.

“Nittele Tower has four different types of damping devices installed, 2 TMD’s for habitability under wind induced vibrations, 32 oil dampers for wind induced vibrations and weak/ medium class earthquakes, 64 unbonded bracing dampers and 312 link beam dampers for extremely strong earthquakes.”  (Advanced structural wind engineering, 2013, Springer, Tokyo ; Heidelberg.)

See also
 Ghibli Clock

References

External links
 
  

Buildings and structures in Minato, Tokyo
High-tech architecture
Nippon TV
Office buildings completed in 2004
Shiodome
Skyscraper office buildings in Tokyo
Richard Rogers buildings
Mitsubishi Estate
2004 establishments in Japan